Thirteen warships of the Royal Navy have been named HMS Revenge:
  was a 46-gun galleon launched in 1577. She fought the Spanish Armada in 1588, and was captured by a Spanish fleet in 1591. She sank while being sailed back to Spain.
  was a 42-gun ship, previously a merchantman, purchased in 1650 by the Royalists.  Her crew deserted to the Parliamentarians in 1652, bringing the ship with them. She was renamed Marmaduke, and was sunk in 1667 as a blockship.
  was a 58-gun third rate launched in 1654 as Newbury, during the Commonwealth. She was renamed Revenge at the Restoration, and was condemned in 1678. 
  was 70-gun third rate launched in 1699, and renamed Buckingham in 1711 before being hulked in 1727. She was subsequently sunk as a foundation in 1745. 
She was rebuilt three times and was sold in 1787.
  was a sloop commanded by Benjamin Norton for privateering in the British colonies.
  was a 14-gun brig-sloop in service in 1778 and captured by the Americans in 1779.
  was an 8-gun cutter purchased in 1796 and listed until 1798.
  was a 74-gun third rate launched in 1805 and broken up in 1849.
  was a 91-gun screw powered second rate launched in 1859.  She was used as a base ship from 1872, became a training ship and was renamed Empress in 1891, and was sold for breaking up in 1923.
  was a  launched in 1892. She was renamed  in 1915 and was broken up in 1919.
She was on harbour service from 1945 and was scrapped in 1948.
  was a  launched in 1968 and laid up in 1995.

Also
  was a 16, or 28-gun ship that the Bombay Dockyard launched in 1755 for the Bombay Marine, the naval arm of the British East India Company. Revenge foundered in 1782 off Bombay in a storm.
Revenge was a gunboat that the garrison at Gibraltar launched in June 1782 during the Great Siege of Gibraltar. She was one of 12. Each was armed with an 18-pounder gun, and received a crew of 21 men drawn from Royal Navy vessels stationed at Gibraltar.  provided Revenges crew.

Battle honours
Ships named Revenge have earned the following battle honours:

Armada, 1588
Azores, 1591
Lowestoft, 1665
Four Days' Battle, 1666
Orfordness, 1666
Bugia, 1671
Schooneveld, 1673
Marbella, 1705
Orphee, 1758
Quiberon Bay, 1759
Trafalgar, 1805
Basque Roads, 1809
Belgian Coast, 1914−15
Jutland, 1916
Atlantic, 1939−41
English Channel, 1940

Citations and references
Citations

References
Drinkwater, John (1905) A History of the Siege of Gibraltar, 1779-1783: With a Description and Account of that Garrison from the Earliest Times. (J. Murray).
 
 

Royal Navy ship names